Zsolt Zsoldos (14 February 1967 – 5 July 1996) was a Hungarian judoka. He competed in the men's half-middleweight event at the 1992 Summer Olympics. Zsoldos died in a car accident near Kecskemét in July 1996, aged 29.

References

1967 births
1996 deaths
Hungarian male judoka
Olympic judoka of Hungary
Judoka at the 1992 Summer Olympics
Sportspeople from Pécs
Road incident deaths in Hungary
20th-century Hungarian people